WJSN-FM (97.3 FM) is a radio station  broadcasting a country music format. Licensed to Jackson, Kentucky, United States, the station is currently owned by Intermountain Broadcasting Co.

References

External links

JSN-FM
Breathitt County, Kentucky